This article is the second sub-division of Lists of Marylebone Cricket Club players. It presents an alphabetical listing of cricketers who debuted for Marylebone Cricket Club (MCC) in first-class cricket from the beginning of the 1827 season until the end of the 1863 season. Many of the players continued to represent the club after 1863 but they are only listed here, as it was in this period that they made their MCC debuts. Players who debuted for MCC before 1827 can be found in List of Marylebone Cricket Club players (1787–1826).

The "roundarm era" began in 1827 with the roundarm trial matches being played that season; 1863 was the last season before overarm bowling was legalised.

MCC played all its home matches through the roundarm era at its own Lord's venue in north London. Although many of the players who represented the club were members or ground staff, others were associated with county clubs or teams and appeared for MCC by invitation. MCC teams have always operated at all levels of the sport and players who represented the club in minor cricket only are out of scope here.

The details are the player's usual name followed by the span of years in which he was active as an MCC player in important matches (the span may include years in which he played in minor matches only for MCC and/or years in which he did not represent MCC in any matches) and then his name is given as it would appear on modern match scorecards (e.g., surname preceded by all initials). In cases where the player represented significant other teams besides MCC, these are given at the end of his entry.

A
 Sir Thomas Abdy, 1st Baronet, of Albyns (1834) : T. N. Abdy (MCC)
 Tom Adams (1838–1856) : T. M. Adams (Kent, Players, South)
 William Agar (1835) : W. T. Agar (CUCC)
 Montague Ainslie (1847) : M. M. Ainslie (OUCC)
 Charles W. Alcock (1862) : C. W. Alcock (MCC)
 Russell Aldridge (1855) : R. Aldridge (MCC)
 Caledon Alexander (1849) : C. D. Alexander 
 Henry Anderson (1830–1842) : H. Anderson (MCC)
 Robert Anderson (1837–1841) : R. M. Anderson (MCC)
 Thomas Anson (1839–1845) : T. A. Anson  (Cambridge Town Club, CUCC, Gentlemen)
 Anthony Henry Ashley-Cooper (1830–1833) : A. H. Ashley-Cooper (MCC)
 John Athawes (1860) : J. T. Athawes
 George Attfield (1845) : G. C. Attfield (MCC)
 Edward Austen (1844) : E. T. Austen (MCC)
 Cholmeley Austen-Leigh (1862) : C. Austen-Leigh
 Charles Austen-Leigh (1862–1863) : C. E. Austen-Leigh
 Spencer Austen-Leigh (1858) : S. Austen-Leigh (MCC)

B
 Thomas Bagge (1862) : T. E. Bagge (CUCC)
 William Bagge (1839) : W. Bagge (Norfolk)
 Alfred Baillie (1850–1857) : A. W. Baillie (MCC)
 Duncan Baillie (1850) : D. J. Baillie (MCC)
 George Baker (1862) : G. Baker (Kent, South)
 Archibald Balfour (1862) : A. Balfour (MCC)
 Edward Balfour (1853–1854) : E. Balfour (OUCC, Gentlemen)
 Thomas Balston (1851) : T. Balston (MCC)
 Edward Banbury (1846) : E. Banbury (MCC)
 George Banbury (1860) : G. Banbury 
 Thomas Barker (1836–1845) : T. Barker (Nottinghamshire, North, Players)
 George Barker (1854–1857) : G. W. Barker (MCC)
 Christopher Barnes (1860) : C. H. Barnes (MCC)
 Henry Barnett (1836–1839) : H. Barnett (MCC)
 William Barnett (1837–1838) : W. Barnett (MCC)
 Barton (1832) : Barton (MCC)
 John Bastard (1840) : J. H. Bastard (CUCC)
 Samuel Bateson (1844) : S. S. Bateson (MCC)
 Frederick Bathurst (1859) : F. Bathurst (OUCC)
 Wynyard Battye (1859) : W. Battye (MCC)
 Robert Bayford (1858–1865) : R. A. Bayford (CUCC, Middlesex)
 Emilius Bayley (1842–1843) : J. R. L. E. Bayley (Kent)
 John Bayley (1832–1850) : J. Bayley (Players, South, Surrey)
 Lyttleton Bayley (1846–1847) : L. H. Bayley (Kent)
 Walter Bearblock (1831) : W. Bearblock (MCC)
 Aubrey Beauclerk (1837) : A. F. J. Beauclerk (MCC)
 Charles Beauclerk (1834–1845) : C. W. Beauclerk (OUCC, Gentlemen)
 Frederick Bell (1858) : F. W. Bell (CTC, North, Players)
 William Bennett (1832–1845) : W. A. B. Bennett (Kent)
 Ralph Benson (1855) : R. A. Benson (MCC)
 William Benthall (1861–1863) : W. H. Benthall (Gentlemen, Middlesex, South)
 C. Bentley (1827) : C. Bentley 
 Samuel Biddulph (1863–1874) : S. Biddulph (Nottinghamshire, North)
 Thomas Bignall (1863–1864) : T. Bignall (Nottinghamshire, North, Players)
 Thomas Blake (1832–1833) : T. G. Blake (Suffolk)
 Blanchard (1859) : Blanchard (MCC)
 Nathaniel Bland (1836) : N. Bland (MCC)
 Henry Bligh (1853) : H. Bligh (Kent)
 Edward Blore (1855) : E. W. Blore (CUCC)
 Henry Boldero (1852) : H. K. Boldero (CUCC)
 William Procter Bolland (1836–1843) : W. P. Bolland (MCC)
 Bond (1835) : Bond 
 William Bonsey (1839) : W. H. Bonsey (MCC)
 John Boothby (1858–1859) : J. G. Boothby (MCC)
 Thomas Bourke (1843) : T. J. D. Bourke (MCC)
 Claude Bowes-Lyon, 13th Earl of Strathmore and Kinghorne (1843–1846) : C. Bowes-Lyon (MCC)
 William Bowyer-Smijth (1845–1848) : W. Bowyer-Smijth (MCC)
 Thomas Box (1838–1846) : T. Box (Sussex, Players, South)
 Charles Brampton (1856–1861) : C. Brampton (Nottinghamshire, North, Players)
 Jem Broadbridge (1830–1833) : J. Broadbridge (Sussex, Players)
 Henry Bromley (1844) : H. Bromley (MCC)
 Francis Brooke (1836) : F. C. Brooke 
 Robert Broughton (1835–1864) : R. J. P. Broughton (CUCC)
 William Brown (1837–1842) : W. Brown (Sussex)
 David Buchanan (1860) : D. Buchanan (CUCC)
 Alfred Buckley (1851–1852) : A. Buckley (MCC)
 Duncombe Buckley (1851–1852) : D. F. Buckley (MCC)
 William Buller (1833–1839) : W. C. Buller (MCC)
 James Redfoord Bulwer (1843–1845) : J. B. R. Bulwer (CUCC)
 Lord Burghley (1847–1851) : Lord Burghley (CUCC, North)
 Thomas Burgoyne junior (1835–1844) : T. Burgoyne (MCC)
 Lewis Burnand (1863–1864) : L. W. Burnand (MCC)
 James Burt (1827–1830) : J. Burt (Hampshire)
 Arthur Button (1838) : A. Z. Button (MCC)

C
 William Caffyn (1850–1857) : W. Caffyn (Surrey, Players, South)
 George Caldwell (1830–1834) : G. Caldwell (MCC)
 Berney Caldwell (1832–1844) : H. B. Caldwell (MCC)
 Charles Calmady (1828) : C. B. Calmady
 Edmund Calverley (1849–1855) : E. Calverley (CUCC)
 Charles Calvert (1849) : C. T. Calvert (CUCC)
 Dudley Campbell (1854) : D. Campbell (CUCC)
 Hugh Campbell (1837) : H. P. H. Campbell (MCC)
 John Carpenter Garnier (1863) : J. Carpenter-Garnier
 George Cavendish-Bentinck (1840–1846) : G. A. F. Cavendish-Bentinck (CUCC)
 George Cayley (1854–1862) : G. A. Cayley (CUCC)
 Thomas Chamberlayne (1844) : T. Chamberlayne (Hampshire)
 C. W. Champion de Crespigny (1843) : C. W. Champion de Crespigny (MCC)
 Arthur Chapman (1860–1863) : A. G. Chapman (Sussex)
 W. Chapman (1850) : W. Chapman
 Thomas Charlton (1839) : T. B. Charlton
 Richard Charteris (1847) : R. Charteris 
 George Chatterton (1851–1861) : G. Chatterton (Sheffield, North, Players)
 James Chatterton (1859–1867) : J. Chatterton (Nottinghamshire, North)
 James Chester (1849–1859) : J. Chester (Surrey, Players, South)
 Joseph William Chitty (1846–1847) : J. W. Chitty
 Henry Cholmondeley (1844) : H. P. Cholmondeley 
 C. Clarke (1837) : C. Clarke
 William Clarke (1846–1853) : W. Clarke (Nottinghamshire, North, Players)
 William Clarke (1848) : W. G. Clarke
 H. Clarkson (1855) : H. Clarkson 
 William Clayton (1861) : W. C. Clayton (Gentlemen of England)
 Reynold Clement (1863) : R. A. Clement
 Lord Clifton (1873–1880) : Lord Clifton (Kent)
 Stephen Clissold (1848) : S. T. Clissold
 Robert Dillon, 3rd Baron Clonbrock (1833) : Lord Clonbrock (Gentlemen)
 James Cobbett (1827–1841) : J. Cobbett (Sheffield, Players, North)
 Wenman Coke (1851) : W. C. W. Coke
 Charles Coleridge (1850) : C. E. Coleridge (Hampshire, OUCC, South)
 William Commerell (1846) : W. A. Commerell (Oxford University)
 Francis Compton (1853–1854) : F. Compton
 George Cooke (1852–1853) : G. F. Cooke
 St Vincent Cotton (1831–1835) : S. Cotton (Cambridge Town Club, Sussex, Gentlemen)
 Thomas Craven (1842–1843) : T. Craven (Gentlemen)
 Richard Crawley (1853–1854) : R. S. Crawley
 Arthur Crichton (1856) : A. W. Crichton
 Sir Frederick Currie, 2nd Baronet (1846) : F. L. Currie
 Herbert Mascall Curteis (1855) : H. M. Curteis (Sussex)

D
 Samuel Dakin (1847–1855) : S. Dakin (Cambridge Town Club, North, Players)
 Harrison Dalton (1846) : H. Dalton
 Mathew Daplyn (1835) : M. Daplyn
 James Dark (1827–1843) : J. H. Dark (Players)
 John Davidson (1829–1835) : J. Davidson
 William Davidson (1832–1837) : W. Davidson
 Thomas Davis (1860) : T. Davis (Nottinghamshire)
 Augustus de Bourbel (1854) : A. A. de Bourbel
 Tommy de Grey (1862–1866) : T. de Grey (CUCC)
 Jemmy Dean (1837–1861) : J. Dean (Sussex, Players)
 William Denison (1832) : W. Denison
 Lambert Denne (1859) : L. H. Denne
 Thomas Denne (1831–1832) : T. Denne
 Edward Dewing (1843–1848) : E. M. Dewing (CUCC, Gentlemen)
 Alfred Diver (1848–1850) : A. J. D. Diver (Middlesex)
 John Dolignon (1832–1843) : J. W. Dolignon
 William Dorrinton (1844–1846) : W. Dorrinton (Hampshire, Kent, Players)
 Stephen Dowell (1860) : S. Dowell
 Edward Drake (1853–1873) : E. T. Drake (CUCC, South, Gentlemen)
 Alfred du Cane (1855) : A. R. du Cane (CUCC)
 Charles du Cane (1848–1855) : C. du Cane (MCC)
 George Du Pré Porcher (1848–1851) : G. D. Porcher 
 Huntley Duff (1844) : H. G. G. Duff 
 Frederick Dugmore (1854) : F. W. J. Dugmore 
 Viscount Dupplin (1852) : Viscount Dupplin (MCC)
 John Durell Durell (1838) : J. D. Durell (OUCC)
 Thomas Dykes (1844) : T. Dykes (CUCC)

E
 Charles Ormston Eaton (1849–1853) : C. O. Eaton
 Frederick Morton Eden (1852) : F. M. Eden (OUCC)
 Charles Ellis (1833) : C. Ellis (Gentlemen)
 Edmund Ellis (1861–1863) : E. H. Ellis
 W. Ellis (1835) : W. Ellis 
 Henry Ellison (1833–1835) : H. J. Ellison (CUCC)
 Edward Elmhirst (1835–1851) : E. Elmhirst
 M. Erle (1849) : M. Erle

F
 Frederick Fagge (1843) : J. F. Fagge
 Arthur Farmer (1839) : A. A. Farmer (Surrey)
 Nicholas Felix (1830) : N. Felix
 Harvey Fellows (1847–1869) : H. W. Fellows (Gentlemen)
 Walter Fellows (1853–1855) : W. Fellows (OUCC, Gentlemen, South)
 Barclay Field (1861) : B. Field
 Cecil Fiennes (1856–1858) : C. B. T. W. Fiennes (MCC)
 John Fiennes (1850–1852) : J. F. T. W. Fiennes (MCC)
 Robert Allan Fitzgerald (1858–1874) : R. A. Fitzgerald (Middlesex, North)
 Charles Fitzwilliam (1849) : C. W. W. Fitzwilliam (MCC)
 C. B. Ford (1837) : C. B. Ford
 Frederick Ford (1836) : F. Ford (MCC)
 George Ford (1839) : G. J. Ford (OUCC)
 J. Ford (1836) : J. Ford
 James Ford (1857) : J. E. Ford (Gentlemen of England)
 William Ford (1839–1849) : W. A. Ford (MCC)
 Ralph Forster (1861–1870) : R. Forster
 Henry Foster (1849–1850) : H. S. Foster
 William Franks (1845–1848) : W. Franks
 J. R. Freeling (1843) : J. R. Freeling (Oxford University)
 Charles Freer (1842–1846) : C. T. Freer
 John Fuller (1854–1858) : J. M. Fuller (Cambridge Town Club, CUCC, Gentlemen)

G
 Roger Gadsden (1852–1853) : R. Gadsden
 Gloucester Gambier (1839) : G. Gambier (MCC)
 Alan Stewart, 10th Earl of Galloway (1858–1864) : Lord Garlies
 Henry Garth (1844) : H. Garth 
 Richard Garth (1839–1844) : R. Garth (Hampshire, Surrey, OUCC)
 William Gayner (1851) : W. C. Gayner
 Augustus George (1844–1847) : A. K. George
 Billy Good (1836–1847) : B. Good (Nottinghamshire, North, Players)
 Charles Gordon (1852–1864) : C. Gordon (Middlesex)
 William Goulding (1862) : W. Goulding (Middlesex)
 George Gowan (1849) : G. M. Gowan
 Francis Grant (1851) : F. Grant 
 Edward Grimston (1832–1851) : E. H. Grimston
 Francis Grimston (1844–1851) : F. S. Grimston (CUCC)
 James Grimston, 2nd Earl of Verulam (1830–1843) : J. W. Grimston
 Robert Grimston (1836–1855) : R. Grimston (Middlesex, Gentlemen, South)
 Robert Grosvenor, 2nd Baron Ebury (1861–1863) : R. W. Grosvenor
 James Grundy (1851–1869) : J. Grundy (Nottinghamshire, North, Players)
 Lord Guernsey (1847–1855) : Lord Guernsey (North)

H
 Charles Hale (1832) : C. Hale (CUCC)
 William Hammersley (1847–1849) : W. J. Hammersley (Cambridge Town Club, Surrey)
 Henry Hand (1838) : H. G. Hand (CUCC)
 Frederick Hankey (1852–1853) : F. A. Hankey
 Reginald Hankey (1853–1860) : R. Hankey (OUCC, Surrey, Gentlemen)
 Hare (1830) : Hare 
 Archibald Harenc (1859) : A. R. Harenc
 Charles Harenc (1830–1849) : C. J. Harenc (Kent, Gentlemen)
 Edward Harman (1837) : E. B. Harman (MCC)
 Edward Hartnell (1853–1862) : E. G. Hartnell (Surrey)
 Edward Hartopp (1842–1852) : E. S. E. Hartopp (CUCC, Nottinghamshire, North, Gentlemen)
 Charles Harvey (1859) : C. M. Harvey (Middlesex)
 Charles Hawkins (1840–1842) : C. Hawkins (Sussex, Players)
 John Hay (1843) : J. W. Hay
 Arthur Haygarth (1844–1861) : A. Haygarth (Middlesex, Gentlemen, South)
 Daniel Hayward senior (1841) : D. Hayward 
 Thomas Hearne (1857–1876) : T. Hearne (Middlesex, North, Players, South)
 Sir Frederick Hervey-Bathurst, 3rd Baronet (1831–1855) : F. H. Hervey-Bathurst (Hampshire, Gentlemen)
 Sir Frederick Hervey-Bathurst, 4th Baronet (1852–1861) : F. T. A. Hervey-Bathurst (Hampshire)
 Henry Hildyard (1844) : H. C. T. Hildyard 
 Geoffrey Hill (1861) : G. R. C. Hill
 James Hill (1857) : J. E. Hill 
 Earl of Hillsborough (1837) : Earl of Hillsborough (MCC)
 William Hillyer (1836–1853) : W. R. Hillyer (Kent, South, Players)
 Arthur Hoare (1847) : A. M. Hoare (CUCC, Surrey, Gentlemen)
 Charles Hoare (1847–1854) : C. H. Hoare (Surrey, South)
 Henry Hoare (1835–1838) : H. J. Hoare
 Thomas Hoblyn (1863) : T. H. Hoblyn 
 George Hodgkinson (1858) : G. L. Hodgkinson (Middlesex, OUCC, Gentlemen)
 Robert Holden (1835–1836) : R. Holden 
 William Hollis (1843) : W. Hollis
 Charles Hope (1858–1859) : C. S. Hope 
 Ferdinand Hope-Grant (1862–1863) : F. C. Hope-Grant (CUCC)
 Henry Howard (1830–1837) : H. Howard
 Ferdinand Huddleston (1841) : F. Huddleston
 Abraham Hume (1840–1842) : A. Hume (CUCC)
 Francis Hurt (1840) : F. Hurt

I
 Townsend Ince (1849) : T. Ince

J
 Herbert Jenner (1828–1834) : H. Jenner (Kent, Gentlemen)
 Henry Jenner (1839) : H. L. Jenner (CUCC)
 William Jervis (1850–1852) : W. M. Jervis
 George Randall Johnson (1859–1862) : G. R. Johnson (CUCC)
 Rowland Jones-Bateman (1849) : R. L. Jones-Bateman

K
 Walter Kavanagh (1834) : W. Kavanagh (CUCC)
 Robert William Keate (1835–1849) : R. W. Keate (OUCC, Hampshire, Gentlemen)
 George Kettle (1839–1851) : G. M. Kettle (North)
 Robert Turner King (1847) : R. T. King (Cambridge Town Club, CUCC, Gentlemen, North)
 Arthur Kingscote (1858–1859) : A. F. Kingscote
 John Kirwan (1842) : J. H. Kirwan (CUCC)
 James Kitson (1832) : J. Kitson
 Henry Knatchbull (1829–1849) : H. E. Knatchbull (OUCC, Gentlemen)
 Brook Knight (1845) : B. J. Knight
 Gregory Knight (1853) : G. Knight
 Philip Knight (1854–1864) : P. H. Knight (CUCC)
 Roger Kynaston (1829–1856) : R. Kynaston (Gentlemen)

L
 Gilbert Lacy (1854) : G. D. Lacy 
 John Lambert (1842) : J. A. Lambert 
 Thomas Lambert (1852) : T. Lambert 
 George Langdon (1839) : G. L. Langdon (Sussex)
 William Lautour (1845–1847) : W. F. J. Lautour (Hampshire)
 Alexander Law (1858–1866) : A. P. Law 
 William Leake (1858) : W. M. Leake
 Francis Lear (1843) : F. Lear (OUCC)
 Edward Leathes (1828–1833) : E. Leathes (Suffolk)
 John Lee (1847) : J. M. Lee (CUCC, Surrey, Gentlemen)
 Earl of Leicester (1851) : Earl of Leicester (MCC)
 Edward Chandos Leigh (1856) : E. C. Leigh
 John Leslie (1843) : J. Leslie (OUCC)
 George Liddell (1840–1852) : G. A. F. Liddell
 William Lillywhite (1830–1851) : F. W. Lillywhite (Hampshire, Sussex, Players)
 John Lillywhite (1856–1860) : J. Lillywhite (Middlesex, Sussex, Players, South)
 Henry Lindow (1849) : H. W. Lindow 
 Charles Lloyd (1819–1850) : C. S. Lloyd (MCC)
 Tom Lockyer (1856) : T. Lockyer (Surrey, Players, South)
 Frederick Loftus (1830) : F. Loftus (Middlesex)
 Lord Henry Loftus (1841–1842) : H. Y. A. Loftus (OUCC)
 Samuel Lowndes (1846–1847) : S. Lowndes
 Charles Lyttelton, 8th Viscount Cobham (1863–1866) : C. G. Lyttelton (CUCC, Gentlemen)

M
 Sir Archibald Macdonald, 3rd Baronet (1841) : A. K. Macdonald
 Henry Maister (1832) : H. Maister (Gentlmen of England)
 Charles Maitland (1842–1843) : C. L. B. Maitland 
 John Manners-Sutton, 3rd Viscount Canterbury (1836) : J. H. T. Manners-Sutton (CUCC)
 Earl of March (1837–1838) : Earl of March (OUCC)
 Tom Marsden (1830–1837) : T. Marsden (Sheffield, North, Players)
 Alexander Marshall (1853–1857) : A. Marshall (Surrey)
 Frederic Marshall (1854–1865) : F. Marshall (South)
 Henry Marshall (1859–1863) : H. Marshall
 Henry Marshall (1844–1845) : H. J. Marshall 
 C. D. B. Marsham (1857–1859) : C. D. B. Marsham (OUCC, Gentlemen)
 Charles Marsham (1855–1867) : C. J. B. Marsham (Gentlemen)
 Robert Marsham (1857–1859) : R. H. B. Marsham (Gentlemen)
 Will Martingell (1844–1860) : W. Martingell (Surrey, Players, South)
 William Massey (1839–1842) : W. Massey (CUCC)
 William Mather (1853) : W. A. Mather 
 Henry Mayne (1844–1849) : H. B. Mayne (Kent)
 John Mayo (1850–1851) : J. P. Mayo (Middlesex)
 Joseph McCormick (1854–1866) : J. McCormick (CUCC, North)
 Edward McNiven (1851) : E. McNiven (Surrey, Gentlemen)
 Frederick Methuen, 2nd Baron Methuen (1843) : F. H. P. Methuen
 William Meyrick (1835–1837) : W. Meyrick (Gentlemen)
 Frederick Micklethwait (1839–1848) : F. N. Micklethwait
 Barrington Mills (1844–1845) : B. S. T. Mills (OUCC)
 William Mills (1842–1844) : W. Mills (CUCC)
 Douglas Moffat (1863) : D. Moffat
 William Moncrieff (1847) : W. Moncrieff 
 Sir Thomas Moncreiffe, 7th Baronet (1841–1852) : T. Moncreiffe
 Spencer Montagu (1831–1840) : S. D. Montagu 
 Robert Monypenny (1861–1862) : R. P. D. Monypenny (MCC)
 John Mordaunt (1863) : J. M. Mordaunt 
 Charles Morse (1844–1851) : C. Morse (CUCC)
 Thomas Lloyd-Mostyn (1851–1853) : T. E. M. L. Mostyn
 Pierrepont Mundy (1842) : P. H. Mundy (Gentlemen, Manchester, North)
 Herbert Murray (1853) : H. H. Murray
 Muson (1831) : Muson (MCC)
 George Muttlebury (1860) : G. A. Muttlebury 
 Alfred Mynn (1833–1847) : A. Mynn (Kent, Gentlemen, South)
 Walter Mynn (1836) : W. P. Mynn (Kent, Gentlemen)

N
 James Naper (1846) : J. L. Naper
 Charles Napier (1838) : C. W. A. Napier (OUCC)
 Henry Nethercote (1843–1854) : H. O. Nethercote (North)
 Henry Neville (1844) : H. A. Neville
 William Newman (1857) : W. Newman
 Ralph Nicholson (1842) : R. C. Nicholson (Gentlemen)
 Richard Nicholson (1841) : R. P. Nicholson (Gentlemen)
 William Nicholson (1846–1869) : W. Nicholson (Middlesex, Gentlemen, South)
 Thomas Nixon (1851–1859) : T. Nixon (Nottinghamshire, North, Players)
 Thomas Nixon (1862) : T. H. Nixon
 Charles Norman (1852) : C. L. Norman (CUCC)
 Henry Norman (1834) : H. Norman (Kent)
 M. Norton (1837) : M. Norton

O
 Sir Charles Oakeley, 4th Baronet (1857) : C. W. A. Oakeley (OUCC)
 Frederick Oliver (1855) : F. W. Oliver (Surrey)
 A. Onslow (1835)
 Denzil Onslow (1860–1873) : D. R. Onslow (CUCC, Sussex)

P
 James Pagden (1830) : J. W. Pagden
 John Paine (1855) : J. G. Paine
 William Parnell (1859–1870) : W. H. Parnell (I Zingari)
 Charles Parnther (1833–1835) : C. H. Parnther (CUCC, Gentlemen)
 George Parr (1863) : G. Parr (Nottinghamshire, North, Players)
 William Paterson (1835–1840) : W. S. Paterson 
 Alfred Payne (1857–1858) : A. Payne (Gentlemen, North)
 Arthur Payne (1857) : A. F. Payne
 Sir Robert Peel, 3rd Baronet (1843) : R. Peel
 Oliver Pell (1847–1848) : O. C. Pell (Cambridge Town Club, CUCC, Gentlemen)
 John Pepys (1861–1867) : J. A. Pepys (Kent, OUCC, South)
 Henry Perkins (1857–1868) : H. Perkins (Cambridge Town Club)
 John Perkins (1863–1868) : J. Perkins (Cambridge Town Club)
 John Scourfield (1829–1852) : J. H. Philipps
 George Philips (1858) : G. H. Philips 
 Edward Pickering (1828–1848) : E. H. Pickering (CUCC)
 William Pickering (1841–1843) : W. P. Pickering (Cambridge Town Club, CUCC, Gentlemen)
 George Pickering (1843) : G. S. Pickering 
 Frederick Pigou (1836) : F. J. Pigou (Gentlemen)
 Fuller Pilch (1831–1845) : F. Pilch (Kent, Norfolk, North, Players)
 Henry Plowden (1863–1866) : H. M. Plowden (CUCC)
 Charles Plumer (1860) : C. G. Plumer
 James Pollitt (1851) : J. P. Pollitt (Middlesex)
 Frederick Ponsonby, 6th Earl of Bessborough (1834–1859) : F. G. B. Ponsonby (CUCC, Surrey, Gentlemen)
 John Ponsonby, 5th Earl of Bessborough (1830–1836) : J. G. B. Ponsonby (MCC)
 Spencer Ponsonby-Fane (1841–1862) : S. C. B. Ponsonby (Surrey, Gentlemen)
 Edward Prest (1855–1859) : E. B. Prest
 Price (1840–1842) : Captain Price (Sussex)
 G. Proctor (1841) : G. Proctor

R
 John Randolph (1846–1864) : J. Randolph
 Abram Rawlinson (1849–1853) : A. L. Rawlinson
 Henry Raymond-Barker (1844–1847) : H. B. Raymond-Barker (CUCC)
 Richard Reade (1860) : R. B. Reade
 A. Ready (1843) : A. Ready
 Thomas Reay (1853–1855) : T. O. Reay 
 Sam Redgate (1835–1838) : S. Redgate (Nottinghamshire, North, Players)
 Hayter Reed (1831–1833) : H. T. Reed
 Edmund Reeves (1851) : E. Reeves (Middlesex, Surrey)
 J. Richardson (1840–1843) : J. Richardson (Hampshire)
 Charles Ridding (1852) : C. H. Ridding
 William Ridding (1849–1851) : W. Ridding (OUCC, Gentlemen)
 Caleb Robinson (1861–1862) : C. Robinson 
 Charles Rogers (1861) : C. Rogers (Manchester)
 Charles Romilly (1828–1833) : C. Romilly (Gentlemen)
 Edward Romilly (1827–1830) : E. Romilly (CUCC, Gentlemen)
 Frederick Romilly (1836) : F. Romilly
 Joseph Rowbotham (1856) : J. Rowbotham
 Henry Royston (1843–1861) : H. Royston (Middlesex, South)
 Lord Charles Russell (1833–1851) : Lord C. J. F. Russell
 Henry Stuart Russell (1839) : H. S. Russell (OUCC)

S
 Thomas Sanders (1839) : T. Sanders
 James Saunders (1828–1831) : J. Saunders (Surrey, Players)
 Arthur Savile (1840–1841) : A. Savile (CUCC)
 Edward Sayres (1838–1842) : E. Sayres (Cambridge Town Club, CUCC, Gentlemen)
 John Sayres (1841) : J. Sayres
 George Vane-Tempest, 5th Marquess of Londonderry (1840–1846) : Viscount Seaham
 William Searle (1829) : W. Searle (Kent, Surrey)
 John Seton Karr (1837–1838) : J. Seton Karr (OUCC)
 Tom Sewell senior (1836–1851) : T. Sewell senior (Surrey, Players)
 Sir Michael Shaw Stewart, 7th Baronet (1850) : M. R. Shaw-Stewart
 John Sheppard (1845) : J. G. Sheppard 
 Tom Sherman (1850) : T. Sherman (Surrey, South)
 Edward Sivewright (1828) : E. Sivewright (Kent, Surrey, CUCC)
 Archibald Levin Smith (1861–1864) : A. L. Smith
 H. Smith (1832) : H. Smith 
 R. B. Smith (1843) : R. B. Smith (Hampshire)
 Stephen Smith (1852) : S. Smith
 Villiers Smith (1849) : V. S. C. Smith
 Raymond Smythies (1854) : R. B. Smythies
 Henry Snow (1834–1839) : H. J. Snow (CUCC, Surrey)
 Stephen Soames (1850–1853) : S. Soames (OUCC)
 Francis Stacey (1855–1863) : F. E. Stacey
 George Grey, 7th Earl of Stamford (1851–1858) : Earl of Stamford
 Ned Stephenson (1857–1858) : E. Stephenson (Sheffield, North)
 Arthur Stone (1849) : A. Stone
 William Strahan (1832–1849) : W. Strahan (Surrey, Gentlemen)
 John Strange (1836–1839) : J. Strange (Gentlemen)
 Thomas Lyon-Bowes, 12th Earl of Strathmore and Kinghorne (1844–1857) : Lord Strathmore
 Henry Strutt, 2nd Baron Belper (1863–1865) : H. Strutt
 A. Stuart (1838–1839) : A. Stuart
 H. Stubbs (1830) : H. Stubbs 
 James Sutton (1859) : J. Sutton 
 Richard Sutton (1850–1851) : R. Sutton
 Edward Swann (1846) : E. G. Swann
 William Sykes (1848) : W. Sykes

T
 James Tabor (1863) : J. A. C. Tabor 
 Walter Talbot (1851) : W. C. Talbot
 Charles Taylor (1836–1846) : C. G. Taylor (Cambridge Town Club, CUCC, Sussex, Gentlemen)
 S. Taylor (1848–1863) : S. Taylor
 Thomas Taylor (1850–1851) : T. C. Taylor (Middlesex)
 Frederick Thackeray (1839–1842) : F. Thackeray (Cambridge Town Club, CUCC, North)
 Alfred Thesiger (1861) : A. H. Thesiger
 Richard Thomas (1833) : R. Thomas
 John Thornhill (1840–1842) : J. Thornhill (MCC)
 R. Thornhill (1835) : R. Thornhill
 Theodore Thring (1840) : T. Thring (MCC)
 Henry Torre (1839) : H. J. Torre (OUCC)
 Alfred Torrens (1855) : A. Torrens
 Thomas Townley (1847–1848) : T. M. Townley (CUCC)
 William Traill (1862–1866) : W. F. Traill (Kent, South)
 Edward Tredcroft (1851–1865) : E. Tredcroft
 Walter Trevelyan (1846–1851) : W. B. Trevelyan (MCC, Midland Counties)
 Thomas Tuck (1832–1842) : T. R. Tuck
 Edward Turnour, 5th Earl Winterton (1862–1863) : E. Turnour (Sussex)

V
 Henry Veitch (1856) : H. G. J. Veitch (OUCC)
 Henry Vernon (1852–1854) : H. Vernon (CUCC, Gentlemen)
 Henry Vigne (1837–1838) : H. G. Vigne

W
 James Walford (1860) : J. H. Walford (CUCC)
 Arthur Henry Walker (1855–1861) : A. H. Walker (Middlesex, Gentlemen)
 Frederic Walker (1853–1856) : F. Walker (Gentlemen)
 Henry Walker (1833–1842) : H. Walker
 Isaac Walker (1862–1884) : I. D. Walker (Middlesex, Gentlemen, South)
 John Walker (1847–1863) : J. Walker (Middlesex)
 Russell Walker (1862–1878) : R. D. Walker (Middlesex, OUCC, Gentlemen)
 V. E. Walker (1856–1870) : V. E. Walker (Middlesex, Gentlemen, South)
 Arthur Ward (1853–1854) : A. R. Ward (CUCC)
 Matthew Ward (1835–1836) : M. Ward 
 Townsend Warner (1863) : G. T. Warner (Cambridge Town Club, CUCC)
 James Watney junior (1851–1852) : J. Watney (Surrey)
 Richard Wellesley (1841) : R. Wellesley 
 Frederick Wells (1830) : F. Wells
 George Wells (1860–1861) : G. Wells (Sussex, South)
 Ned Wenman (1830–1844) : E. G. Wenman (Kent, Players, South)
 David Whigham (1856–1857) : D. D. Whigham
 Charles Whittaker (1841–1846) : C. G. Whittaker (Kent, Gentlemen)
 Frederick Whymper (1851) : F. H. Whymper
 Thomas Wickham (1851) : T. P. Wickham
 Philip Williams (1849) : P. Williams
 Tom Wills (1855–1856) : T. W. Wills (CUCC, Kent)
 Edgar Willsher (1863) : E. Willsher (Kent, Players, South)
 Sir John Eardley-Wilmot, 2nd Baronet (1840) : J. E. Wilmot
 Alfred Wilson (1851–1855) : A. Wilson
 Fuller Wilson (1851–1853) : F. M. Wilson
 William Wingfield (1861) : W. Wingfield
 Henry Wodehouse (1829–1833) : H. Wodehouse (Gentlemen)
 Charles Wombwell (1845) : C. O. Wombwell
 Skynner Woodruffe (1836–1837) : S. G. Woodruffe
 George Wootton (1862–1873) : G. Wootton (Nottinghamshire, North, Players)
 Warwick Reed Wroth (1848) : W. R. Wroth (CUCC)
 Arthur Wrottesley, 3rd Baron Wrottesley (1845) : A. Wrottesley
 Halifax Wyatt (1858) : M. T. H. Wyatt
 Charles Wynch (1859–1865) : C. G. Wynch (Sussex, Gentlemen)
 John Wynne (1850) : J. H. G. Wynne
 Thomas Wythe (1839–1841) : T. M. Wythe

References

Marylebone